The MisEducation of Bindu is a 2019 American independent comedy film directed by Prarthana Mohan and starring David Arquette, Megan Suri and Priyanka Bose.  Mark Duplass and Jay Duplass served as executive producers.

Cast
Megan Suri as Bindu Chaudry, Kasturi's daughter and Bill's step-daughter 
Philip Labes as Peter, Bindu's friend 
Gordon Winarick as Sam, Bindu's friend
Priyanka Bose as Kasturi Chaudry, Bindu's mom and Bill's wife
David Arquette as Bill, Kasturi's husband and Bindu's step-father

Production
Principal photography took place in Broad Ripple High School.

Release 
The film screened in the narrative competition at the San Diego International Film Festival.

Accolades
The film won the Indiana Spotlight Award at the 2019 Heartland International Film Festival.

Prarthana Mohan won the Chris Brinker Award given to first time directors at the San Diego International Film Festival.

References

External links
 

American independent films
American comedy films
Films shot in Indiana
2010s English-language films
2010s American films